Barbara Kwiatkowska-Lass (1 June 1940 – 6 March 1995) was a Polish actress.

Early life and career
Barbara Kwiatkowska was born in Patrowo, a village near Gostynin in central Poland, then under German-occupied Poland, which the Nazis had renamed Gasten in 1939 through 1941 (at time of her birth). Then changed to Walrode from June 1941 until the end of the war. Although she received ballet and dance education, she eventually took up an acting career. After her debut role in Tadeusz Chmielewski's comedy Ewa chce spać (1957) she gained wider popularity in Poland. The role had been offered to her after she took the first place in a contest organized by a popular Polish cinema magazine.

In 1959 she left Poland for the West and soon starred in a few major films like La millième fenêtre (with Jean-Louis Trintignant) and The Joy of Living (with Alain Delon).

Personal life
She married film director Roman Polanski in 1959; they divorced in 1962. The following year she met Karlheinz Böhm on the set of the movie  (Rififi à Tokyo, 1963) in Tokyo; the couple later married, their daughter is actress Katharina Böhm. Kwiatkowska-Lass divorced Böhm in 1980, and married Polish jazz musician Leszek Żądło, with whom she lived until her death.

Politics
Kwiatkowska was opposed to the Communist regime in Poland and cooperated with the United States-controlled Radio Free Europe/Radio Liberty, which transmitted anti-communist propaganda, information and programmes free from censorship to Poland.

Death
On 6 March 1995, Kwiatkowska-Lass collapsed and died from a brain hemorrhage aged 54, in Munich. She was interred in Kraków's Rakowicki Cemetery.

Filmography

References

External links
 

Burials at Rakowicki Cemetery
Polish film actresses
Polish television actresses
Actresses from Kraków
Polish anti-communists
1940 births
1995 deaths
20th-century Polish actresses